Éric Taborda (born 14 January 1969) is a retired French footballer. A defender, he was active as a professional in France, Switzerland and Scotland.

Career
Born in Lyon, Taborda played for Olympique Lyonnais, US Orléans, RC Ancenis, FC Mulhouse, Toulouse FC, AC Lugano, Clydebank and La Roche VF.

References

External links
 Profile at LFP
Profile at Scottish Football Archive

1969 births
Living people
French footballers
Clydebank F.C. (1965) players
Olympique Lyonnais players
FC Mulhouse players
Toulouse FC players
La Roche VF players
Association football defenders